Mariya Mykolayivna Povkh (Марі́я Микола́ївна По́вх, born  8 January 1989) is a Ukrainian canoeist. She represented her country at the 2016 Summer Olympics. She also won medals at the European Championships.

References 

1989 births
Living people
Ukrainian female canoeists
Canoeists at the 2016 Summer Olympics
Canoeists at the 2020 Summer Olympics
Olympic canoeists of Ukraine
European Games bronze medalists for Ukraine
Canoeists at the 2015 European Games
Canoeists at the 2019 European Games
European Games gold medalists for Ukraine
European Games medalists in canoeing